The German Museum of Books and Writing ( (DBSM)) in Leipzig, Germany, founded in 1884 as Deutsches Buchgewerbe-Museum, is the world's oldest museum of its kind, dedicated to collecting and preserving objects and documents as well as literature connected with the history of books, including paper, printing techniques, the art of illustration, and bookbinding. The museum is housed in a modern €60 million annex to the German National Library in Leipzig built in 2011.

A rare copy of a 42-line Gutenberg Bible printed on vellum was among the books in the collection. At the end of World War II, the Bible was taken as war booty and transferred to the Russian State Library in Moscow, where it remains today.

References

External links
 

1884 establishments in Germany
Buildings and structures in Leipzig
Media museums in Germany
Museums established in 1884
Museums in Leipzig